Behind the Mask: My Autobiography is an autobiography by Tyson Fury. It was published by Penguin Random House imprint Century on 14 November 2019. It details the story of how Fury defeated the long-reigning unified heavyweight world champion Wladimir Klitschko in 2015, his struggles with mental health following the win and his subsequent recovery process.

Behind the Mask reached the number-one bestseller position on Amazon within 24 hours of its release.

References 

2019 non-fiction books
Sports autobiographies
Boxing books